Kukh may refer to:
Kukh Sar Tazin
Kukh Sheykh ol Eslam
Kukh-e Hajji Karim
Kukh-e Kani Guyz
Kukh-e Mamu
Kukh-e Sufi Rashi Piruz